Vladimir Viktorovich Mirgorod (born November 1, 1979), known as The Strangler, is a Russian serial killer who killed 16 people from 2003 to 2004. He was detained in 2010, when his fingerprints matched with those found at the crime scenes. In 2012, he was sentenced to life imprisonment.

Biography 
Mirgorod was born in Moscow in 1979. He lived in the Timiryazevsky District, in the metro area Petrovsko-Razumovskaya. After finishing school, he entered MISiS, but left soon after finding a good job. His friends spoke only positively of him.

Mirgorod committed the first murder in January 2003, killing a 25-year-old from Minsk in her own apartment, stealing valuables from her house. Her body was found on January 18. In March 2003, he raped and strangled a 22-year-old visitor from Omsk, and a few days later, Mirgorod raped and strangled a 20-year-old girl in the surrounding forest region. On April 18, he killed a 33-year-old woman named Natalia Kurochkina, coming from Novosibirsk, and on July 1, he raped and strangled a 28-year-old woman in the Botanical Garden. Three days later, he killed a 23-year-old girl. On July 21, Mirgorod killed a 50-year-old woman and her 15-year-old son. Despite the last double murder being different than others, police did not rule out the possibility of a serial killer.

At the end of 2004, Mirgorod was arrested for the rape and robbery of a woman, for which he served a 6-year-old sentence from January 2005 to July 2010 based on the court decision made at the Preobrazhensky District Court. At the end of 2010, Mirgorod was released, but when his fingerprints were registered in the database, a match was found to those found at the murder sites. Initially, he confessed to 8 murders, but a subsequent genetic examination proved his involvement in a total of 16 murders. In 2012, Mirgorod was sentenced to life imprisonment, with the Supreme Court of Russia leaving his sentence unchanged. Mirgorod was transferred to the Black Berkut colony in the Sverdlovsk Oblast, but later moved to the Snowflake Prison in Khabarovsk Krai.

See also
 List of Russian serial killers
 List of serial killers by number of victims

References

External links
 
 Маньяк нВладимир Миргород, задушивший 15 девушек в Москве и Подмосковье, получил пожизненный срокасиль = 2017-01-13, gazeta.ru, 30 January 2012 (in Russian).
 Москвич получил пожизненный срок за убийства 15 жентак: неуловимость маньяка списали на его обаятельность = 2017-01-13, newsru.com, 30 January 2012 (in Russian).

1979 births
Living people
Male serial killers
People convicted of robbery
Criminals from Moscow
Russian people convicted of murder
Russian people convicted of rape
Russian murderers of children
Russian rapists
Russian serial killers